Karthika Muralidharan (born 18 January 1997) is an Indian actress who works in Malayalam film industry. She made her acting debut in 2017 with the Malayalam film Comrade in America co-starring Dulquer Salmaan. Her second movie was Uncle co-starring Mammootty. She is the daughter of veteran cinematographer C. K. Muraleedharan.

Filmography

References

External links

Living people
1997 births
Indian film actresses
Actresses from Kochi
Actresses in Malayalam cinema